Rahimzoda is a jamoat in Tajikistan. It is located in Rasht District, one of the Districts of Republican Subordination. The jamoat has a total population of 12,114 (2015). It consists of 24 villages, including Sangi Maliki (the seat) and Shule.

Notes

References

Populated places in Districts of Republican Subordination
Jamoats of Tajikistan